The National Association of Broadcast Employees and Technicians (NABET-CWA) is a labor union representing employees in television, radio, film, and media production. A division of the Communications Workers of America (CWA), NABET represents about 12,000 workers organized into about 35 local unions ("locals").

The union was first organized in 1934 as the Association of Technical Employees (ATE), at first covering employees involved in network television and radio; the union was created by NBC as a way to prevent its own workers from joining the International Brotherhood of Electrical Workers. The ATE would soon expand to other radio networks, and by 1937, ATE also included independent radio and television stations. In 1939 the ATE achieved a union shop clause.

The union's name changed to NABET in 1940 and was affiliated with the Congress of Industrial Organizations (CIO) in 1951. In 1952 Canadian radio, television and film workers were entered into the NABET fold. In 1965, NABET expanded to include workers in the film industry.

In 1968, Canadian NABET locals achieved local autonomy followed in 1974 by full autonomy. These locals are affiliated with Unifor.

In 1994, NABET merged with the CWA and changed its name to NABET-CWA.

In 2021, NABET-CWA helped organize two units of tech and digital workers in NPR's Digital Media, Communications, and Audience Growth divisions as a part of the Campaign to Organize Digital Employees (CODE-CWA) initiative to organize tech workers in the US and Canada.

Its current officers are Sector President Charles G. Braico and Sector Vice President Lou Marinaro, both elected on June 6, 2015.

See also
 James Harvey Brown (1906–1995), president

References

External links
NABET official website

Entertainment industry unions
Communications Workers of America
Trade unions established in 1934
Congress of Industrial Organizations
1934 establishments in the United States
Online mass media companies of the United States